Garnotia cheesemanii, the Rarotongan garnotia grass, is a species of grass in the family Poaceae that is endemic to the Cook Islands in the South Pacific. 

The species is classified as Critically Endangered because of its extremely restricted range and population fragmentation.

Distribution 
It is found on the Cook Islands.

Taxonomy 
It was described by Eduard Hackel in: Trans. Linn. Soc. London, Bot. 6: 303. in 1903.

References 

Panicoideae
Taxa named by Eduard Hackel